Rey Ortiz (born January 6, 1997) is a professional soccer player who plays as an attacking midfielder. Born in Mexico, he represented the United States national under-15 team.

Career

Youth and college 
Ortiz played with the LA Galaxy academy for three years. While part of the Galaxy academy, Ortiz appeared for their United Soccer League side LA Galaxy II, making an 86th-minute substitute appearance on August 15, 2015 during a 3–2 win over Austin Aztex.

In 2016, Ortiz attended the University of Portland to play college soccer. During his time with the Pilots, Ortiz made 64 appearances, scoring 14 goals and tallying 26 assists.

While at college, Ortiz played with USL PDL side Portland Timbers U23s during their 2017, 2018 and 2019 seasons.

Professional 
On January 9, 2020, Ortiz was selected 29th overall in the 2020 MLS SuperDraft by FC Cincinnati. He was signed by the club on February 21, 2020.

On February 28, 2020, Ortiz was loaned to USL Championship side Charlotte Independence for the entirety of the 2020 season.

Ortiz was released by Cincinnati at the end of their 2020 season.

On June 4, 2021, Ortiz signed with USL League One side Chattanooga Red Wolves.

International
Born in Acapulco, Mexico and raised in California, United States, Ortiz is eligible to represent both countries. He has appeared for the United States at U-14 and U-15 level.

References

External links 
 
 University of Portland bio

1997 births
Living people
American soccer players
Association football forwards
Charlotte Independence players
FC Cincinnati draft picks
FC Cincinnati players
LA Galaxy II players
Portland Timbers U23s players
Portland Pilots men's soccer players
Soccer players from San Diego
United States men's youth international soccer players
USL Championship players
USL League Two players
Chattanooga Red Wolves SC players
USL League One players